Pan Britannica Industries Ltd  (PBI) was a household and agrochemical formulation company based at Britannica House, Stewardstone Road, Waltham Abbey and with a distribution presence in Wisbech in Cambridgeshire. PBI was, in common with many other UK household names, both a manufacturer and marketing organisation for both agricultural and horticultural products.

PBI produced many agro-chemical formulations that were popular with farmers in many parts of the globe. However it was best known for its product Baby Bio, a liquid plant food that came in a notable small perfume-shaped bottle. Other major products by PBI are the Expert range of books, such as the Garden Expert, House Plant Expert, Greenhouse Expert etc. written by, Dr D.G. Hessayon, who later became chairman of PBI.  

The company was sold to the Sumitomo corporation in the late eighties, and rebranded as pbi Home & Garden in 1998.

Cancer allegations 

The company's formulation plant in Waltham Abbey was alleged to be at the centre and therefore the cause of a cancer hotspot. This was highlighted by Storyline, an investigative television programme by Carlton Television, in early 1993. Reports of an unusual occurrence of cancer around the plant and subsequent legal action taken by the residents were the basis for this programme.

References 

  
Bayer
 
Environmental chemistry
Defunct manufacturing companies of the United Kingdom
Companies based in Hertfordshire